Venera 7 was a Soviet spacecraft, part of the Venera series of probes to Venus. When it landed on the Venusian surface on 15 December 1970, it became the first spacecraft to soft land on another planet and the first to transmit data from there back to Earth.

Design

This was significantly greater than what was expected to be encountered but significant uncertainties as to the surface temperatures and pressure of Venus resulted in the designers’ opting for a large margin of error. The degree of hardening added mass to the probe which limited the amount of mass available for scientific instruments both on the probe itself and the interplanetary bus. The interplanetary bus carried a solar wind charged particle detector and a  cosmic ray detector. On the lander there were temperature and pressure sensors as well as an accelerometer to measure atmospheric density. The probe also carried a radar altimeter.

Launch 
The probe was launched from Earth on 17 August 1970, at 05:38 UTC. It consisted of an interplanetary bus, based on the 3MV system, and a lander. During the flight to Venus, two in-course corrections were made using the bus' on-board KDU-414 engine.

Landing 
Venera 7 entered the atmosphere of Venus on 15 December 1970. The lander remained attached to the interplanetary bus during the initial stages of atmospheric entry, to allow the bus to cool the lander to −8 °C (17 °F) for as long as possible. The lander was ejected once atmospheric buffeting broke the interplanetary bus's lock-on with Earth. Six minutes after the unreefing, the parachute started to fail, resulting in a descent more rapid than planned. The parachute eventually failed completely, and the probe entered a period of freefall.

The probe appeared to go silent on impact, but recording tapes kept rolling. A few weeks later, upon a review of the tapes by the radio astronomer Oleg Rzhiga, another 23 minutes of very weak signals were found on them. The spacecraft had landed on Venus, and probably bounced onto its side, leaving the medium gain antenna aimed incorrectly for proper signal transmission to Earth.

The probe transmitted information to Earth for 53 minutes, which included about 20 minutes from the surface. It was found that the temperature at the surface of Venus was  ± 20 °C. Using the temperature, and models of the atmosphere, a pressure of 9.0 MPa (1,300 psi) ± 1.5 MPa was calculated. From the spacecraft's rapid halt (from falling to stationary inside 0.2 seconds), it was possible to conclude that the craft had hit a solid surface with low levels of dust.

The probe provided information about the surface of Venus, which could not be seen through a thick veil of atmosphere. The spacecraft confirmed that humans cannot survive on the surface of Venus. It excluded the possibility that there is any liquid water on the planet.

See also

 List of missions to Venus
 Timeline of artificial satellites and space probes

Notes

References

External links 
 Venera 7 NASA NSSDC Master Catalog Data
 Plumbing the Atmosphere of Venus

1970 in the Soviet Union
Derelict landers (spacecraft)
Spacecraft launched in 1970
Venera program